Lovro Mazalin (born 28 June 1997) is a Croatian professional basketball player for Cibona of the Croatian League and the ABA League.

Professional career
Mazalin spent two years in Cibona's youth system before moving to city rivals Cedevita in July 2013.

Mazalin was chosen as the most valuable player of the Croatian League All Star 2015 in Rijeka, scoring 25 points and dominating the exhibition game alongside another young player Ante Žižić, who scored 33.

Mazalin signed a new four-year deal with Cedevita in March 2015.

On August 19, 2016, Mazalin was loaned to KK Zadar.

References

External links
 Profile at abaliga.com
 Profile at eurobasket.com
 Profile at euroleague.net
 Profile at FIBA

1996 births
Living people
ABA League players
Basket Zaragoza players
Croatian men's basketball players
KK Cedevita players
KK Cibona players
KK Zadar players
KK Gorica players
Liga ACB players
OKK Spars players
Shooting guards
Small forwards
People from Sisak
Poitiers Basket 86 players